Rev. Anthony Grey (1557 – 9 November 1643) was Earl of Kent from 1639 to his death.

He was a son of George Grey by Margery, daughter of Gerard Salvaine of Croxdale. George was the apparently only son of Anthony Grey of Brancepeth, a son of George Grey, 2nd Earl of Kent, by his second wife Katherine (or Katharine or Catherine), daughter of William Herbert, 1st Earl of Pembroke.

In 1639, Grey succeeded his childless second cousin once removed Henry Grey, 8th Earl of Kent. Henry was a great-grandson of Henry Grey, 4th Earl of Kent, another son of the 2nd Earl.

A priest in the Church of England, Grey was rector at Aston Flamville and later Burbage.

Family and issue
Grey married Magdalene, daughter of William Purefoy of Caldecote by Catherine (or Katherine) Wigston. Burke's Landed Gentry mentions his wife having a sister named Dorothy Purefoy who married Roger Dudley and was mother to Thomas Dudley, Governor of Massachusetts, however, other sources identify Susanna Thorne as the mother of Thomas, and Susanna's mother as Mary Purefoy.

Anthony and Magdalene had twelve children, all born in Burbage:

Grace (29 April 1593 – ). Married James Ward of Hugglescote Grange Leicestershire
Henry, 10th Earl of Kent (24 November 1594 – 28 May 1651).
Magdalene (14 November 1596 – September 1668). Married John Browne of Stretton en le Field see Cave-Browne
Christian (8 May 1598 – 5 June 1681).  Married the Rev. Theophilus Burdett, rector of Burton Overy, in 1626.
Faithmyjoye (1599–1602).
Priscilla (1601–1665).
Patience (b. 1603). Married a man of the Wood family.
John (April 1605 – September 1605).
Job (b. 1606), rector of Burbage and South Kilworth Leicestershire
Theophilus (1608 – 30 March 1679)
Nathaniel/Nathaniell (1613 – 9 May 1683).
Presela (b. 1615).

Ancestry

Sources
Database of FamilySearch.org – (The Church of Jesus Christ of Latter-day Saints)
CP, "Kent"
http://www.stirnet.com/genie/data/british/gg/grey03.php 
http://www.stirnet.com/genie/data/british/ss4as/salvin2.php 
http://www.stirnet.com/genie/data/british/ss4as/salvin1.php 
http://www.stirnet.com/genie/data/british/pp/purefoy1.php 
 Ancestry.com. The American ancestors and descendants of Willard William and Cora Dunham Boyd : 1620-1928 [database on-line]. Provo, UT: Ancestry.com Operations Inc, 2005.

1557 births
1643 deaths
16th-century English Anglican priests
17th-century English Anglican priests
Earls of Kent (1465 creation)
Anthony
16th-century English nobility